is a railway station in Chiba, Chiba, Japan, operated by East Japan Railway Company (JR East) and Chiba Urban Monorail.

Lines
Chiba Station is served by the following lines.

JR East
Sobu Main Line
 Chūō-Sōbu Line
 Sobu Line (Rapid)
Narita Line
Sotobo Line
Uchibo Line

Chiba Urban Monorail
 Line 1
 Line 2

Station layout

JR East

Chiba Urban Monorail

History

The station opened on 20 July 1894.
The present station building was built in 1963. Rebuilding work was scheduled to start in January 2010, with the new station building opening in fiscal 2015.

Passenger statistics
In fiscal 2013, the JR East station was used by 105,812 passengers daily (boarding passengers only), making it the 33rd-busiest station operated by JR East. In fiscal 2011, the Chiba Urban Monorail station was used by an average of 10,639 passengers per day (boarding passengers only), making it the busiest station operated by Chiba Urban Monorail. The daily passenger figures (boarding passengers only) for JR East in previous years are as shown below.

Bus terminal

Highway buses 
 Flower Liner; For Tōgane Station, Gumyō Station, and Narutō Station
 Polar Star; For Sendai Station
 Kapina; For Makuta Station, Obitsu Station, Kururi Station, Kururi Castle, Awa-Kamogawa Station
 Nanso Satomi; For Tateyama Station, Kokonoe Station, Chikura Station
 For Tokyo Skytree, Shinjuku Station
 For Ōtsu Station, Yamashina Station, Sanjō Station, and Kyōto Station

References

External links
 JR East station information 
 Chiba Monorail station information 

Railway stations in Chiba Prefecture
Railway stations in Japan opened in 1894
Sōbu Main Line
Chūō-Sōbu Line
Sotobō Line
Uchibō Line
Chiba Urban Monorail Line 1
Chiba Urban Monorail Line 2
Stations of East Japan Railway Company
Stations of Chiba Urban Monorail
Railway stations in Chiba (city)